Niccolò I may refer to:

 Niccolò I d'Este, Marquis of Modena and Ferrara (died 1344), see Duke of Ferrara and of Modena
 Niccolò I Ludovisi (1634–1664)
 Niccolò I Sanudo (died in 1341)
 Niccolò I Trinci (died in 1421)

See also

 Nicholas I (disambiguation)
 Niccolò (name)